Annika Alexandra Holopainen (born 4 August 1993) is a Finnish professional basketball player and a member of the Finnish national team. She played college basketball for the University of Portland and later Old Dominion University. Following her college career, she has played professionally in Europe.

Club career
Holopainen started her career with Tapiolan Honka in the second-tier Naisten I Divisioona. She later played for Espoo Basket Team with whom she won the Finnish Basketball Cup in 2011. The same year she was named the Naisten Korisliiga Sixth Man of the Year and the Newcomer of the Year.

During the 2017–2018 season she played for TSV 1880 Wasserburg in the Damen-Basketball-Bundesliga and the EuroCup. She helped the team win the German Basketball Cup in 2018. The following season, she became the first Finnish woman to play in the Polish Basket Liga Kobiet when she joined AZS Politechnika Gdańsk. For the season she averaged 7.8 points and 3.3 rebounds per game.

She played for Champagne Châlons-Reims Basket Féminin during the 2019–2020, averaging 8.9 in 18 games.

In August 2020, Holopainen signed with KR of the Icelandic Úrvalsdeild kvenna. In her first game, she scored 43 points in a loss against Keflavík. For the season she led the league in scoring with 25.9 points per game while also averaging 9.3 rebounds and 1.6 assists.

Statistics

College statistics

Source

References

External links
Finnish statistics at Finnish Basketball Association
Icelandic statistics at Icelandic Basketball Association
College profile
Profile at EuroBasket.com

1993 births
Living people
Finnish expatriate basketball people in France
Finnish expatriate basketball people in Germany
Finnish expatriate basketball people in Iceland
Finnish expatriate basketball people in the United States
Finnish expatriate basketball people in Poland
Finnish women's basketball players
Forwards (basketball)
KR women's basketball players
Old Dominion Monarchs women's basketball players
Portland Pilots women's basketball players
Úrvalsdeild kvenna basketball players